Bernadette Schober (born 15 July 1984) is a road cyclist from Austria. She won the Austrian National Road Race Championships in 2003. She represented her nation at the 2005 and 2006 UCI Road World Championships.

References

External links
 profile at Procyclingstats.com

1984 births
Austrian female cyclists
Living people
Place of birth missing (living people)
21st-century Austrian women